Solar credits are an initiative of the Australian Federal Government used as a multiplier to increase the number of small-scale technology certificates (STCs) able to be created for eligible solar panel, wind and hydro energy systems.

Solar credits apply to small generation units and create multiple small-scale technology certificates for the eligible part of their capacity. This applies to the first 1.5 kilowatts (kW) for eligible mains connected systems. Off-grid systems may be eligible for solar credits for the first 20 kW if an annual capacity limit is not reached.

References

External links
 Small generation unit STC calculator

Solar energy in Australia